Nicolás Hernández may refer to:

 Nicolás Hernández (Argentine footballer) (born 1979), Argentine football forward
 Nicolás Hernández (Colombian footballer) (born 1998), Colombian football centre-back